The NIH Intramural Research Program (IRP) is the internal research program of the National Institutes of Health (NIH), known for its synergistic approach to biomedical science. With 1,200 Principal Investigators and over 4,000 Postdoctoral Fellows conducting basic, translational, and clinical research, the NIH Intramural Research Program is the largest biomedical research institution on earth. The unique funding environment of the IRP facilitates opportunities to conduct both long-term and high-impact science that would otherwise be difficult to undertake. With rigorous external reviews ensuring that only the most outstanding research secures funding, the IRP is responsible for many scientific accomplishments, including the discovery of fluoride to prevent tooth decay, the use of lithium to manage bipolar disorder, and the creation of vaccines against hepatitis, Hemophilus influenzae (Hib), and human papillomavirus (HPV). In addition, the IRP has also produced or trained 21 Nobel Prize-winning scientists.

Mission
Within the framework of the NIH mandate, the Intramural Research Program's mission is to:
 Conduct distinctive, laboratory, clinical, behavioral, translational and population-based research that breaks new ground and defines scientific excellence 
 Facilitate new approaches to improve health through prevention, early detection, diagnosis, and treatment by developing and/or using innovative technologies, approaches or devices
 Respond rapidly to critical public health needs
 Train the next generation of biomedical and behavioral researchers
 Foster sharing of information and dissemination of the IRP's major discoveries to the public through partnerships with academic institutions and industry

History
The NIH Intramural Research Program (IRP) traces its roots to 1887, when a one-room laboratory on Staten Island was created within the Marine Hospital Service, a predecessor agency to the U.S. Public Health Service. This laboratory evolved into the Hygienic Laboratory, which moved to Washington, D.C., in 1891 and, with the Ransdell Act of 1930, became the National Institute of Health. Several of the IRP's initial Institutes were established over the next two decades and, after World War II, Vannevar Bush, director of the Office of Scientific Research and Development, outlined a program for postwar scientific research that affirmed the contributions of "remote and unexpected fields of medicine and the underlying sciences" in the progress against disease and the benefits of cooperative endeavors with industry and academia. 
	
The disease orientation and categorical structure of the IRP had its genesis in the establishment of the National Cancer Institute (NCI) in 1944. In 1948, Congress passed the National Heart Act, which created the National Heart Institute, and soon after established institutes for research on mental health, oral diseases, neurological problems, and blindness. Today, the IRP consists of individual programs housed in 23 of the NIH Institutes and Centers, creating a network of multi-disciplinary, federally funded laboratories with an emphasis on translational research.  The National Institutes of Health Clinical Center, the world's largest clinical research hospital, is designed to foster smooth transitions between laboratory work, patient studies, and bedside cures, facilitating the translation of laboratory findings to new approaches for the prevention and cure of human diseases.

Organization and leadership
The National Institutes of Health (NIH) is composed of 27 Institutes and Centers, most of which include research programs led by a Scientific Director and conducted by federal researchers and their trainees at one of several NIH campus locations. Collectively, these research programs encompass the Intramural Research Program (IRP). The IRP includes the United States National Library of Medicine, an international resource for researchers, and the NIH Clinical Center, the world's largest clinical research hospital.

Intramural researchers are affiliated with individual Laboratories, Branches or Centers, which are typically organized around common thematic research goals and approaches, much like a department or center at an academic institution. Within these larger structures, Principal Investigators run Sections or Units devoted to their independent research goals. Core facilities, supported by staff scientists and clinicians, are among the shared resources available to IRP researchers.

Scientific interests are not bound by the organizational structure. There exists a full spectrum of scientific interest groups (called SIGs) that brings researchers from different Institutes and Centers together around common areas of scientific interest where ideas can be shared and collaborations initiated.  In addition, institutes come together to work cooperatively on major initiatives focused on unraveling the complexities of disease. The Center for Human Immunology, Autoimmunity and Inflammation (CHI) is one example of this trans-NIH cooperative research approach.

As with all biomedical research, the scientific programs of the IRP's 1,200 Principal Investigators are subject to periodic scientific review. Each Principal Investigator must be peer-reviewed at least once every four years by an external Board of Scientific Counselors (BSC). The BSC evaluates the quality of research, the resources that should be allocated to scientists, and the promise of tenure-track investigators for future success in their careers. These evaluations are based on the Principal Investigator's past accomplishments, objectives met, and future plans. The review criteria mirror those used by extramural peer review with the addition of considering whether the investigator is taking advantage of the special features of the NIH intramural scientific environment and employing useful collaborative arrangements. As a result of these reviews, recommendations for altering allocated resources are prepared by the BSC for the Scientific Director, the Institute or Center Director, the NIH Deputy Director for Intramural Research, and the Institute or Center (IC) National Advisory Council or Board.

Additionally, each IRP as a whole is subject to periodic review by Blue Ribbon Panels. These panels, made up of expert external reviewers appointed by the NIH Director, ensure that the program's overall objectives are current, relevant, distinctive, and appropriate to the unique research environment of the IRP. Blue Ribbon Panel reports are addressed to the NIH Director, the Advisory Committee of the Director, and the IC Director.

In addition to the external NIH Boards of Scientific Counselors and Blue Ribbon Panels, the NIH IRP receives regular and periodic independent evaluations by the following external bodies:
 U.S. Congress and its committees; U.S. Government Accountability Office
 National Academies of Sciences, Institute of Medicine
 Office of the Inspector General
 Office of Management and Budget (e.g., Program Assessment Rating Tool)
 Association for Assessment and Accreditation of Laboratory Animal Care International
 The Joint Commission
 Accreditation Council for Graduate Medical Education
 Accreditation Council for Continuing Medical Education
 Nuclear Regulatory Commission
 Occupational Safety & Health Administration
 Association for Accreditation of Human Research Protection Programs

Nina F. Schor, M.D. is the Deputy Director for Intramural Research and heads the Office of Intramural Research (OIR). In this role, he is responsible for oversight and coordination of all intramural research, training and technology transfer activities.

IRP Programs

NIH Clinical Center
The National Institutes of Health Clinical Center, the world's largest hospital entirely devoted to clinical research, is a national resource that enables the rapid translation of scientific observations and laboratory discoveries into new approaches for diagnosing, treating and preventing disease. Due to its position on the main campus in Bethesda, Maryland, the Institutes and Centers of the IRP are able to mobilize clinical resources quickly and effectively to respond to emerging scientific challenges and opportunities.

The NIH Clinical Center is the 2011 recipient of the Lasker-Bloomberg Public Service Award, given by the Albert and Mary Lasker Foundation. This award honors the Clinical Center for serving as a model institution that has, since 1953, transformed scientific advances into innovative therapies and provided high-quality care to patients and recognizes the Clinical Center's rich history of medical discovery through clinical research.

At the NIH Clinical Center, clinical research participants—more than 480,000 since the hospital opened in 1953—are active partners in medical discovery. This partnership has resulted in a long list of medical milestones, including the development of chemotherapy; the first use of an immunotoxin to treat a malignancy; identification of the genes that cause kidney cancer, leading to the development of six new, targeted treatments for advanced kidney cancer; the discovery that lithium helps depression; the first gene therapy; the first AIDS treatment; and the development of tests to detect AIDS/HIV and hepatitis viruses in blood, which led to a safer blood supply. The NIH Clinical Center sees 10,000 new research participants a year from around the world.

NIH deputy intramural directors 

 G. Burroughs Mider, July 1, 1960-May 19, 1968

 Joseph Edward Rall, June 1983-May 1991

 Lance Liotta, July 6, 1992-August 1993

 Michael M. Gottesman, November 1993-July 31, 2022
 Nina F. Schor, 2022-present

References

External links
 Official website
 The NIH Catalyst

National Institutes of Health
Research